Lucy Hooper (February 4, 1816 – August 1, 1841) was a 19th-century American writer known for her poetry and newspaper accounts. Her interests included botany and poetry. Though she died of consumption at the age of 25, she is remembered for writing The Lady's Book, "one of the most accomplished of the American flower books".

Early years and education
Lucy Hooper was born in Newburyport, Massachusetts, February 4, 1816. Her father was Joseph Hooper, a merchant of that city. Her father assured that she received the best education possible. At the age of fourteen, the family removed to Brooklyn, New York.

Career
Soon after the move to Brooklyn, Hooper became an occasional contributor to the Long Island Star. Though anonymous, her pieces were admired and widely copied. Besides her compositions in verse, upon which Hooper's notability chiefly rests, she was the author of many prose articles of merit. These were collected in a volume, and published in 1840, under the title of Scenes from Real Life. Among them was the prize essay on “Domestic Happiness.” But, like Henry Kirke White, the Davidson sisters, Lucretia and Margaret, as well as others, Hooper's early, brilliant career ended when she was young.

Death and legacy
Since childhood, her health had been delicate, and she was affected deeply by the death of her father, and other domestic problems. Hooper died of consumption at Brooklyn, on August 1, 1841.

Her Poetical Remains was published in 1842, with a memoir by John Keese. Complete Poetical Works was published in 1848, in compliance with the wishes of many of Hooper's friends. Some of the pieces in the second part of this volume had not been previously published, and a few, only in one or two local newspapers. The greater number of them were written at a very early age. Hooper had put aside many of these poems for improvement and correction, that they might not be published until they could appear in a more finished form. At the same time, she destroyed others, lest they might, through the partiality of some friends, come out (as she used to say) "to her utter confusion". These early productions were considered interesting for their natural language. There were also unfinished pieces and fragments, which were thought might add interest to the book. One or two poetical effusions were copied from Riker's Book of Poetry and Flowers, which was edited by Hooper a few months before her death. Hooper's prose writings have never been collected and published in a volume, excepting a few tales, entitled Scenes from Real Life. When arranged for publication they were to make two volumes, one of "Tales and Essays", another "Religious and Moral Stories", for juvenile readers.

Selected works
 Composition book, 1839-1841
 Look at the sky today
 Scenes from real life : and other American tales, 1841
 Floral souvenir. A perennial gift., 1842
 The Lady's book of flowers and poetry to which are added a botanical introduction, a complete floral dictionary, and a chapter on plants in rooms., 1842
 The ladies' hand-book of the language of flowers, 1844
 Poetical remains of the late L. H., collected and arranged; with a memoir by J. Keese., 1848

References

Citations

Attribution

Bibliography

External links
 

1816 births
1841 deaths
People from Newburyport, Massachusetts
Poets from Massachusetts
19th-century American poets
19th-century American women writers
American women poets
19th-century deaths from tuberculosis
Tuberculosis deaths in New York (state)